Laurie Block (1949–2018) was a Canadian poet and educator. Born in Winnipeg, Manitoba, he studied at the University of Winnipeg and the University of Manitoba.

Bibliography
Governing Bodies - poetry, 1988 
Foreign Graces/Bendiciones Ajenas - poetry, 1999 
Time Out of Mind  - poetry, 2006

Awards
Honourable Mention, League of Canadian Poets Annual Contest, 1990
First place in the Manitoba Writers' Guild Writing Contest, 1993
Third place, dANDelion Poetry Contest, 1994
First place in the Manitoba Writers' Guild Writing Contest, 1994
Honourable Mention, League of Canadian Poets Annual Contest, 1997 and 1990.
Honourable Mention, Arc Magazine poem of the year contest, 1998
Second and third prize, Bliss Carman Poetry Award, 1999
First prize, Prairie Fire Fiction Contest 2003
Gold Medal Award for short fiction, National Magazine Awards, Canada, 2004
Winner, Aqua Books Lansdowne Prize for Poetry, 2007

References

 *denotes obituary which appeared in the Winnipeg Free Press on September 1, 2018

External links
 Laurie Block
 Oolichan Books

1949 births
20th-century Canadian dramatists and playwrights
Living people
Writers from Winnipeg
20th-century Canadian poets
21st-century Canadian poets
Canadian male poets
Canadian male dramatists and playwrights
20th-century Canadian male writers
21st-century Canadian male writers